Qurabiya (also ghraybe, ghorayeba, ghoriba, ghribia, ghraïba, gurabija or ghriyyaba and numerous other spellings and pronunciations) is a shortbread-type biscuit, usually made with ground almonds. Versions are found in most Arab and Ottoman cuisines, with various different forms and recipes. They are similar to polvorones from Andalusia.

In the Maghreb and Egypt, they are often served with Libyan tea, Arabic coffee or Maghrebi mint tea.

History
A recipe for a shortbread cookie similar to ghorayebah but without almonds, called in Arabic  (exotic cookie), is given in the earliest known Arab cookbook, the 10th-century Kitab al-Ṭabīḫ. Kurabiye appears in the Ottoman cuisine in the 15th century.

There is some debate about the origin of the words. Some give no other origin for the Turkish word kurabiye than Turkish, while others have given Arabic or Persian. He notes that the Syrian Arabic words / likely derive from the Turkish.

Regional variations

Algeria
Ghribia

 Ghribia with almonds
 Ghribia with peanuts
 Ghribia with walnuts
 Ghribia with pistachios

Armenia 
Khourabia is the Armenian version sometimes referred to in English as Armenian butter cookie or Armenian shortbread cookie. Khourabia was traditionally made with three ingredients: butter, sugar, and flour and usually shaped like bread, wheat ear, or horse shoe signifying health, wealth, and prosperity. It was mostly eaten during the Easter, Christmas, and New Year celebrations. Later, more ingredients were added, like eggs, cinnamon, and walnuts.

Bulgaria
Kurabii name of the Bulgarian cuisine and the many varieties of cookie, a popular sweet variety. Especially during the holiday season, and a variety of jams produced via the new year with powdered sugar cookies decorated with cute shapes are called maslenki.

Cyprus & Greece

The Greek version, called kourabiedes or kourabiethes (plural of kourabies ), resembles a light shortbread, typically made with almonds. Kourabiedes are sometimes made with brandy, usually Metaxa, for flavouring, though vanilla, mastika or rose water are also popular. In some regions of Greece, Christmas kourabiedes are adorned with a single whole spice clove embedded in each biscuit. Kourabiedes are shaped either into crescents or balls, then baked till slightly golden. They are usually rolled in icing sugar while still hot, forming a rich butter-sugar coating. Kourabiedes are popular for special occasions, such as Christmas or baptisms.

The Greek word  comes from the Turkish word kurabiye, which is related to qurabiya, a family of Middle Eastern cookies.

Iran

In Tabriz, they are made of almond flour, sugar, egg white, vanilla, margarine and pistachio. It is served with tea, customarily placed on top of the teacup to make it soft before eating.

Kuwait 
Variants including:
 Ghoriba with Cardamom
 Ghoriba with pistachio
 Ghoriba with saffron

Levant 
 Ghoriba with pistachio
 Ghoriba with Rose water

Libya 
Ghraïba Libyan Arabic translation : | غربية 
 Ghoriba with peanuts 
 Ghoriba with almonds
Ghoriba with walnuts

Morocco
Ghoriba in Morocco and other parts of the Maghreb, the popular cookies often use semolina instead of white flour, giving a distinctive crunch.

the original Ghriba is made from flour and flavored with lemon or orange zest and cinnamon, this sweet is usually served at parties, accompanied by mint tea or coffee.
 Mlouwza, made with almonds and sugar flavored with orange flower water
 Ghoriba bahla
 Ghoriba dyal zite
 Ghoriba mramla

Turkey

The word kurabiye is used to refer to a variety of biscuits in Turkey, not necessarily local ones, although various types of local kurabiye are made; including acıbadem kurabiyesi and un kurabiyesi.

Tunisia
Ghraïba
 Ghraïba bidha, made with wheat flour
 Ghraïba droô, made with sorghum flour
 Ghraïba homs, made with chickpea flour

See also

 Almond cookie
 Polvorón
 Hallongrotta
 List of almond dishes
 List of shortbread biscuits and cookies
Nankhatai
 Panellets
 Şekerpare
 Un kurabiyesi
 Osmania Biscuit
 İzmir Bomb Kurabiye
 Kavala Almond Cookies
 Murabbalı mecidiye

References

Almond cookies
Azerbaijani desserts
Bosnia and Herzegovina cuisine
Bulgarian desserts
Christmas food
Iranian desserts
Shortbread
Tabriz cuisine
Armenian desserts
Turkish desserts
Arab desserts